P Balachandra Menon (17 March 1911 – 14 December 1984) was a politician from Indian State of Kerala who belonged to the Communist Party of India. He was member of Kerala legislative assembly in 1957 and 1960 for Chittur constituency.

He represented Kerala in Rajya Sabha, The Council of States of India parliament during 1967 to 1973.

References

1911 births
1984 deaths
Kerala MLAs 1957–1959
Kerala MLAs 1960–1964
Rajya Sabha members from Kerala
Communist Party of India politicians from Kerala